The 2016 Tulsa mayoral election was held on June 28, 2016 to elect the mayor of Tulsa, Oklahoma. Incumbent mayor Dewey F. Bartlett Jr. lost re-election outright to city councilor G. T. Bynum, eliminating the possibility of a runoff.

Results

References 

Tulsa
Tulsa
2016